"The State of Massachusetts" is a song by American rock band Dropkick Murphys. It was released on February 4, 2008 as the lead single from their sixth studio album, The Meanest of Times. The song is about the effects of drugs on individuals and their families. "The State of Massachusetts" was one of the 100-most-played songs on U.S. modern rock radio in October 2007. By January 2008, the song had become one of the 60-most-played alternative rock songs in the United States. The song was #83 on Rolling Stones list of the 100 Best Songs of 2007. It is the theme song to the MTV show Nitro Circus. The music video was filmed on location in the unused and abandoned Curley Auditorium on the Long Island Health Campus in Boston Harbor. The auditorium is located right next to one of the City of Boston's largest emergency homeless shelters, the Long Island Shelter.

In 2013, six years after its release, the song made its first chart appearance on a Billboard chart when it peaked at number 14 on the Billboard Rock Songs chart following the Boston Marathon bombing.

Track listing

7" vinyl

Weekly charts

References

Songs about Boston
2007 songs
Dropkick Murphys songs
Sports television theme songs
2007 singles
Folk punk songs
Cooking Vinyl singles
Songs about child abuse